José Serrato (September 30, 1868 – September 7, 1960) was a politician who was elected President of Uruguay.

Background
Serrato was a prominent member of the Uruguayan Colorado Party which had long dominated the politics of the country. He was broadly identified with the policies of José Batlle y Ordóñez, but was regarded as not being strongly ideological, and thus able to work with others in the party with more polarized standpoints. He served as Minister of Finance from 1904 to 1907 and from 1911 to 1913.

President of Uruguay
Serrato served as President of Uruguay from 1923 to 1927, succeeding Baltasar Brum in that office. 

In 1925 he presided over the formal opening of the Palacio Legislativo, Montevideo.

He himself was succeeded by Juan Campisteguy.

Post Presidency
Serrano was the president of Banco de la República Oriental del Uruguay from 1933 to 1934. He later served as Uruguayan Foreign Minister under President Juan José de Amézaga.

He died in 1960, more than 30 years after leaving the Presidency.

See also
 Politics of Uruguay

Notes

1868 births
1960 deaths
Foreign ministers of Uruguay
Interior ministers of Uruguay
Ministers of Economics and Finance of Uruguay
Education and Culture Ministers of Uruguay
Ministers of Transport and Public Works of Uruguay
Presidents of Uruguay
Colorado Party (Uruguay) politicians
Uruguayan bankers